The Doomstar Requiem – A Klok Opera Soundtrack is the fourth full-length album by death metal band Dethklok, from the Adult Swim animated series Metalocalypse. It was released digitally on October 27, 2013. It was released on LP and CD in mid March 2014. It is the soundtrack album to the Metalocalypse special of the same name.

Production
The album features a 50 piece orchestra under the direction of Bear McCreary. There is also a "making of" feature included with the album. For the first time, Dethklok's live guitarist Mike Keneally was featured on a studio album.

Release
The first single off the album, "Blazing Star", was released on Loudwire on October 17, 2013. "Blazing Star" is the only official Dethklok song on the album, whereas the rest of the tracks are considered Metalocalypse songs.

The album was initially released as a digital download, with a physical CD and limited edition LP version released in mid March 2014. The digital download version of the album was released two days earlier than the standard release date and the CD version was released three months earlier than the standard release date exclusively on Brendon Small's website. The digital version of the album comes with a downloadable 34-page libretto of the special.

There was no tour to support the album upon release, but select songs from the album were performed live by Brendon Small and the students of the Paul Green Rock Academy in 2014 and 2015.

Reception

Times Leader gave the album (as well as the special itself) a favorable review, stating, "This 'rock opera' should essentially be approached with a keen sense of humor, although the tunes are most enjoyable as a serious, full-blown metal/Broadway juggernaut".

Track listing

Personnel

Virtual personnel from Metalocalypse

Dethklok
Nathan Explosion – vocals, piano
Pickles the Drummer – drums, vocals
Skwisgaar Skwigelf – lead guitar, vocals
Toki Wartooth – rhythm guitar, vocals
William Murderface – bass guitar, vocals

Additional personnel
 Charles Offdensen – vocals 
 Metal Masked Assassin – vocals 
 Magnus Hammersmith – vocals 
 Ishnifus Meaddle – vocals 
 Abigail Remeltindrinc – vocals

Production
 Dethklok – production
 Dick "Magic Ears" Knubbler – production, engineering
 Charles Offdensen – legal

Actual personnel

Dethklok
Brendon Small – vocals, guitars, bass, keyboards, production
Gene Hoglan – drums
Mike Keneally – vocals 
Bryan Beller – bass on "Blazing Star"

Additional personnel
Bear McCreary – orchestra
Thundercat – bass on "How Can I Be a Hero"
George "Corpsegrinder" Fisher – vocals 
Raya Yarbrough – vocals
Jack Black – vocals
Mark Hamill – vocals
Victor Brandt – vocals
Malcolm McDowell – vocals

Production
Ulrich Wild – production, mixing, engineering, vocals
Mastered by Dave Collins
Antonio Cannobio – cover art
Michael Mesker – package design

References

2013 soundtrack albums
Dethklok albums
Albums produced by Ulrich Wild
Death metal soundtracks
Symphonic metal soundtracks